The golden roughy (Aulotrachichthys pulsator) is a slimehead in the order Beryciformes. It is found in the eastern Indian Ocean around south Australia down to depths of around  where it lives in rock reefs.

References

golden roughy
Marine fish of Southern Australia
golden roughy